The 1788–89 United States presidential election in Connecticut took place between December 15, 1788 – January 10, 1789 as part of the 1789 United States presidential election. The state legislature chose seven representatives, or electors to the Electoral College, who voted for President and Vice President.

Connecticut, which had become the 5th state on January 9, 1788, unanimously cast its seven electoral votes for George Washington during its first presidential election.

See also
 United States presidential elections in Connecticut

References

Connecticut
1788-789
United States President